Jahir Butrón Gotuzzo (born 30 October 1975) is a Peruvian football manager and former player who played as a center back. He is the current manager of Juan Aurich.

Butrón is also the older brother of goalkeeper Leao Butrón.

Club career
Butrón started his football career in the popular youth academy of Sporting Cristal but did not manage to win a starting spot in the senior squad. Then from 1995, he played for Peruvian Second Division side Guardia Republicana. There he won the 1995 Peruvian Second Division and thus promotion to the First Division. Then he spent time playing for clubs such as Alcides Vigo, Lawn Tennis F.C., Deportivo Pesquero, and Deportivo Wanka. During his time with Deportivo Wanka, Butrón scored his first goal in the Peruvian First Division in Round 14 of the 2000 Apertura season. He scored in the 85th minute, and it was the final goal in the 4–2 win at home against FBC Melgar.

In 2001 Butrón played for Alianza Atlético of Sullana. He managed to score the winner in Alianza Atlético's home opener of the 2001 season against Estudiantes de Medicina. The following year he returned to Deportivo Wanka and scored two goals for them in the 2002 season. The first goal salvaged a draw and was scored in the 81st minute away to Coronel Bolognesi for a 3–3 result. The other goal secured the three points against Juan Aurich. The next year he rejoined Alianza Atlético. In the 2003 season Butrón once again managed to score against Estudiantes de Medicina in the 3–1 win at home.
Most notably that same season he scored a late equalizer that canceled Antonio Meza Cuadra's early goal away to Peruvian giants Universitario de Deportes for a final 1–1 result.

References

External links

1975 births
Living people
Footballers from Lima
Peruvian footballers
Sporting Cristal footballers
Club Alcides Vigo footballers
Deportivo Pesquero footballers
Club Deportivo Wanka footballers
Alianza Atlético footballers
Cienciano footballers
Total Chalaco footballers
Sport Áncash footballers
Juan Aurich footballers
Colegio Nacional Iquitos footballers
Peruvian Primera División players
Peruvian Segunda División players
Association football central defenders
Peruvian football managers
Peruvian Primera División managers
Alianza Atlético managers
Juan Aurich managers